SolarBridge Technologies (SolarBridge) is a provider of solar micro-inverter, solar inverter for photovoltaic arrays. These types of products aim to increase energy harvest and reliability while reducing the cost of solar installations and maintenance for residential and commercial markets. The company was acquired by solar panel manufacturer SunPower in autumn of 2014.  In 2018 SunPower sold the former SolarBridge microinverter business to Enphase Energy.

History 
SolarBridge was established in 2004 to bring to market power electronics technologies created at the University of Illinois. The company is venture capital backed, raising US$71 million to-date. Investors include Battery Ventures, Rho Ventures, and Osage University Partners.

Market overview
The solar industry is on a drive toward grid parity, or, the point in time at which solar-generated electricity costs the same or less than utility-generated electricity. Many solar analysts predict that most major areas of the world will reach grid parity by 2015, although some are arguing that grid parity is already here in many areas.

As solar module pricing continues to decrease, balance of system (BOS) costs will represent an increasing portion of solar costs. As a result, pressure is mounting to produce lower cost, end-to-end solar energy solutions that are more reliable and simpler to use than existing systems.
 
Utility-scale solar addresses only part of the world's growing energy needs. With significant environmental tradeoffs, utility-scale solar is capital-intensive and bankability is often a concern. Distributed, rooftop solar can be a significant piece of the renewable energy mix, particularly as module-integrated electronics such as microinverters enable the transition to lower cost, easy-to-use AC module solutions.

Products
The SolarBridge Pantheon microinverter is mounted directly on the solar panel to create a roof-ready AC module. Power conversion takes place directly on each module, rather than through the central or string inverter. SolarBridge microinverters are backed by a 25-year warranty.

The SolarBridge Pantheon microinverter passed all tests required under the Underwriters Laboratories 1741 safety standard as certified by the Canadian Standards Association (CSA) in early 2011. SolarBridge works directly with module manufacturers to develop integrated AC modules for the North American market, which were commercially available in 2011.

References

External links 
 

Photovoltaics manufacturers
Companies established in 2004